"Crazy for This Girl" is the debut single of American pop rock duo Evan and Jaron, released on July 24, 2000. It is from their self-titled debut album. It peaked at number 15 on the US Billboard Hot 100 and number four on the Billboard Adult Top 40. It also became a hit in Canada, Italy and New Zealand, reaching number nine on the Italian Singles Chart, number 35 on the New Zealand Singles Chart, and number 45 on the Canadian RPM Top Singles chart. The song was included on the second volume on the soundtrack of The WB's television drama Dawson's Creek.

Music video
Directed by Dani Jacobs, the video features the band's tour bus traveling on a highway at night before stopping at a gas station and diner called "Four Aces". They enter the diner and are persuaded by some girls who give them guitars (from the boss's office) to perform on stage. It attracts a crowd of people who were informed by one of the diner's bartenders played by Daphne Zuniga. An alternative version of the video features scenes from the third season of Dawson's Creek.

Track listings

US CD and cassette single
 "Crazy for This Girl" (album version) – 3:22
 "Crazy for This Girl" (acoustic version) – 3:15

US 7-inch single
A. "Crazy for This Girl" – 3:22
B. "From My Head to My Heart" – 3:10

European CD1
 "Crazy for This Girl" (radio edit) – 2:35
 "Luckiest of the Lucky Ones" (radio edit) – 4:16

European CD2
 "Crazy for This Girl" (radio edit) – 2:35
 "Luckiest of the Lucky Ones" (radio edit) – 4:16
 "Can't Get You Off My Mind" – 3:47
 "Crazy for This Girl" (video)

Australian CD single
 "Crazy for This Girl" (radio edit) – 2:35
 "Crazy for This Girl" (album version) – 3:22
 "Nature Co." – 4:10
 "Can't Get You Off My Mind" – 3:47

Charts

Release history

References

2000 debut singles
2000 songs
Columbia Records singles
Evan and Jaron songs
Song recordings produced by T Bone Burnett
Songs written by Jeff Cohen (songwriter)